"Get the Girl, Grab the Money and Run" is a song by American hip-hop group Souls of Mischief. The song was released as the second promotional single for the soundtrack to the 1994 film A Low Down Dirty Shame.

Track listing
12", CD, Vinyl
"Get the Girl, Grab the Money and Run" (LP Version) - 3:52
"Later On" (LP Version) - 3:04(Casual)
"In Front of the Kids" (LP Version) - 2:41(Extra Prolific)
"Get the Girl, Grab the Money and Run" (Jay-Biz's Low Down Remix) - 3:47
"Later On" (Casual's Low Down Remix) - 3:36(Casual)

Personnel
Information taken from Discogs.
engineering – Matt Kelley
horn – Bill Ortiz
production – A-Plus, Duane "Snupe" Lee, Toure
remixing – Jay-Biz, Will Scott
scratching – Toure

Chart performance

References

External links

1994 singles
1994 songs
American hip hop songs
Jive Records singles
Song recordings produced by A-Plus (rapper)